Peter Paul Sinton-Hewitt CBE FRSA (Born 1960) is the founder of Parkrun. He was appointed a CBE "for services to Grassroots Sport Participation" in 2014, and was selected as an Ashoka Fellow in 2016. In December 2019, he was awarded the Albert Medal (Royal Society of Arts) for building a global participation movement and made a Fellow of the Royal Society of Arts.

Early life
Born in Zimbabwe, Sinton-Hewitt grew up in South Africa. At age five he was made a ward of the state and then lived at boarding schools. He was educated at Potchefstroom High School and was a crew member supporting Bruce Fordyce in the Comrades Marathon.

He moved to the United Kingdom where he was living when he had a breakdown in 1995. He has said that the personal challenges he has experienced, including bullying during childhood, and the way exercise and activity have helped him deal with them, were influential in motivating him in creating parkrun and its inclusive approach to sport.

parkrun
Sinton-Hewitt started the Bushy Park Time Trial in 2004 whilst unemployed and unable to run due to an injured leg. It evolved into Parkrun – a free 5 kilometre timed running event that takes place every Saturday morning. The first event took place on 2 October 2004, with 13 entrants. In April 2010 a two-kilometre "Junior parkrun" format was added at Bushy Park for children aged 4 to 14 (held weekly on Sunday mornings). By summer 2018, each weekend roughly 220,000 to 280,000 people participate in about 1,500 Parkruns globally.

Other pursuits
In 2018, Sinton-Hewitt completed the Vitruvian Triathlon.

References

External links
Athlete history - Paul Sinton-Hewitt Parkrun UK

1960 births
Living people
British philanthropists
British male long-distance runners
Ashoka Fellows
Parkrun
South African emigrants to the United Kingdom